Walnut Street (formerly known as Montclair) is a New Jersey Transit station on Walnut Street at Depot Square in Montclair, New Jersey along the Montclair-Boonton Line. It is the most used station on the Montclair–Boonton Line. Walnut Street is the second or fifth (depending the station of origin) of six stops that are in Montclair along the Montclair-Boonton line. It gets its name from the street that crosses the railroad tracks next to the station. It has a farmers' market in its parking lot from the summer to the early fall.

The station house, built in 1953, has been leased out as a restaurant for many years. The most recent tenant to occupy the space, Mezoco Mexican Taqueria, opened in 2016.

History

Built in 1873 by the Montclair Railway, the station was the Erie Railroad's main station in Montclair. The station was formerly known as Montclair. In 1953, the current building was erected and the old station was demolished. On October 23, 1973, a freight train derailed at the station. The Montclair Connection, which merged the Montclair Branch and the Boonton Line, is a few streets after the station.

Station layout
The station's low-level side platforms are not accessible. The station is located at the corner of Walnut Street and Depot Square, and is in the Walnut street business district.

Bibliography

References

External links

NJ Transit Rail Operations stations
Montclair, New Jersey
Railway stations in the United States opened in 1873
Railway stations in Essex County, New Jersey
Former Erie Railroad stations
1873 establishments in New Jersey